Jack George Shaheen Jr. (September 21, 1935 – July 9, 2017) was a writer and lecturer specializing in addressing racial and ethnic stereotypes. He is the author of Reel Bad Arabs (adapted to a 2006 documentary), The TV Arab (1984) and Arab and Muslim Stereotyping in American Popular Culture (1997).

Early life and education 
Shaheen was born in Pittsburgh to Lebanese Christian immigrants, and grew up in Clairton, Pennsylvania.

Shaheen graduated from Clairton High School in 1953. In 1957, he graduated from Carnegie Institute of Technology with a Bachelor of Fine Arts. In 1964, he received a master's degree from Pennsylvania State University. In 1969, Shaheen received a PhD from the University of Missouri.

Career 
Shaheen's work focused on racism and orientalism, particularly in popular culture such as Hollywood films. He delivered over 1,000 lectures on the issue across the United States and on three continents. He described his life's work in 2015, to Tavis Smiley, as "dedicated to trying to humanize Arabs and Muslims and to give visibility to American Arabs and American Muslims — to have us being projected no better, no worse, than anyone else."

Shaheen was also a former CBS News consultant on Middle East affairs, U.S. Army veteran, and professor emeritus of Mass Communications at Southern Illinois University at Edwardsville.

Shaheen's seminal "Jack Shaheen versus the Comic Book Arab" (1991) has been cited by a multitude of scholars. Jehanzeb Dar, for instance, cited Shaheen as a secondary source for the observation that "Batman speaks Farsi in Beirut" in a comic book storyline. Shaheen additionally contended that, in this same storyline, Batman searched for a " 'Shiite Extremist Group.' " Early Hezbollah's influence in the Beqaa Valley, Batman/Bruce Wayne's destination, thus made the organization a candidate for the vilified "radical Shiite captors" as "bandits-in-bedsheets" in "Death in the Family." Shaheen also first pointed out that the Joker, garbed in "Arab" attire depicted as "Iranian," referred to the "insanity" of Iran.

Honors 
Shaheen received two Fulbright teaching awards He was also the distinguished visiting scholar at New York University’s Hagop Kevorkian Center for Near Eastern Studies.

Personal life 
Shaheen was a fan of the Pittsburgh Steelers, often walked along the beaches of Hilton Head Island and was a former member of the Hilton Head Orchestra board of directors. He also attended, as one obituary describes, "services at Holy Resurrection Greek Orthodox Church in Bluffton. He married Bernice Rafeedie, a Palestinian-American in 1966 and had two children, Michael and Michelle, along with several grandchildren.

Death 
Shaheen died on July 9, 2017 at  the age of 81. People who praised his work include Ralph Nader, who said that Shaheen "provided the incriminating evidence directly from the biased media, unedited", and Ali Mirsepassi, director of New York University's Iranian Studies Initiative, wrote in 2012 that "Jack Shaheen approaches his critical work with little personal or intellectual bitterness, moral arrogance or intellectual superiority."

Works and publications 
 
 
  – originally published in 2001

References

External links
 Jack G. Shaheen Papers at Tamiment Library and Robert F. Wagner Archives, New York University
Jack Shaheen Biography
Dr. Jack Shaheen Interview on www.alrasub.com

1935 births
2017 deaths
American writers of Lebanese descent
Southern Illinois University faculty
Carnegie Mellon University alumni
Pennsylvania State University alumni
University of Missouri alumni
American male journalists
American people of Arab descent
Writers from Pittsburgh